Moving least squares is a method of reconstructing continuous functions from a set of unorganized point samples via the calculation of a weighted least squares measure biased towards the region around the point at which the reconstructed value is requested.

In computer graphics, the moving least squares method is useful for reconstructing a surface from a set of points. Often it is used to create a 3D surface from a point cloud through either downsampling or upsampling.  

In numerical analysis to handle contributions of geometry where it is difficult to obtain discretizations, the moving least squares methods have also been used and generalized to solve PDEs on curved surfaces and other geometries.  This includes numerical methods developed for curved surfaces for solving scalar parabolic PDEs   and vector-valued hydrodynamic PDEs.

In machine learning, moving least squares methods have also been used to develop model classes and learning methods.  This includes function regression methods  and neural network function and operator regression approaches, such as GMLS-Nets.

Definition

Consider a function  and a set of sample points . Then, the moving least square approximation of degree  at the point  is  where  minimizes the weighted least-square error 

In the example .  The smooth interpolator of "order 3" is a quadratic interpolator.

See also
Local regression
Diffuse element method
Moving average

References

The approximation power of moving least squares David Levin, Mathematics of Computation, Volume 67, 1517-1531, 1998 
Moving least squares response surface approximation: Formulation and metal forming applications Piotr Breitkopf; Hakim Naceur; Alain Rassineux; Pierre Villon, Computers and Structures, Volume 83, 17-18, 2005.
 Generalizing the finite element method: diffuse approximation and diffuse elements, B Nayroles, G Touzot. Pierre Villon, P, Computational Mechanics Volume 10, pp 307-318, 1992

External links
 An As-Short-As-Possible Introduction to the Least Squares, Weighted Least Squares and Moving Least Squares Methods for Scattered Data Approximation and Interpolation

Least squares